This is a list of lists of notable Swedes.



By country or ethnicity
List of Sami people
List of Lebanese people in Sweden
List of Swedish Americans
List of Swedish Jews

By university
List of Lund University people
List of Stockholm School of Economics people
List of Uppsala University people

By city
List of people from Gothenburg
List of people from Malmö
List of people from Stockholm

By occupation
List of Swedish actors
Lists of ambassadors of Sweden
List of Swedish architects
List of Swedish artists
List of Swedish billionaires by net worth
List of Swedish clergy and theologians
List of Swedish consorts
List of Swedish entrepreneurs
List of Swedish film directors
List of Swedish folk musicians
List of Swedish journalists
List of Miss Sweden titleholders
Lists of Swedish military personnel
List of Swedes in music
Lists of office-holders in Sweden
List of painters from Sweden
List of Swedish women photographers
List of Swedish poets
Lists of Swedish politicians
List of Swedish politicians
List of Swedish royal mistresses
List of Swedish saints
List of Swedish scientists
Lists of Swedish sportspeople
List of Swedish sportspeople
List of members of the Swedish Academy
List of Swedish women artists
List of Swedish women writers

See also
List of Swedish-language writers
List of Swedish-speaking Finns